Oskar Stamet (9 September 1913 – 21 August 1981) was a Luxembourgian footballer. He competed in the men's tournament at the 1936 Summer Olympics.

References

External links
 
 

1913 births
1981 deaths
Luxembourgian footballers
Luxembourg international footballers
Olympic footballers of Luxembourg
Footballers at the 1936 Summer Olympics
Sportspeople from Luxembourg City
Association football midfielders
CA Spora Luxembourg players